Point San Quentin, later known as Potrero Point was the land projecting into San Francisco Bay, and marking the southern extremity of the now filled in Mission Bay in San Francisco, California.

History 
Originally named by Spanish settlers in the 18th century, it retained the name as Point San Quentin on U.S. Coastal survey maps as late as 1869. By 1882, the land projecting from the southern tip of Mission Bay is shown on maps as Potrero Point, and commonly called The Protrero, for the former Rancho Potrero de San Francisco that had included the point within its boundaries. In the early 1850s the site of the Tubb ropewalk, in the mid 1860s it became the major shipbuilding site for San Francisco. Subsequently, the shoreline of the point along Mission Bay and San Francisco Bay was filled in. By 1880, Potrero Point had become the San Francisco center for heavy industries like the Atlas Iron Works, Bethlehem Shipyard, California Sugar Refinery, Pacific Rolling Mill, and the Union Iron Works. These industries continued there through World War I.

The Dogpatch neighborhood of San Francisco is located on Potrero Point.

References

External links 
  1852 Coastal Survey Map showing Mission Bay and surrounds  About Mission Bay/Mission Creek from sfsailtours.com accessed March 29, 2015.
  1857 Coastal Survey Map showing Mission Bay and surrounds, with additions to 1852 map to up to 1857 About Mission Bay/Mission Creek from sfsailtours.com accessed March 29, 2015.

    

Headlands of California
Landforms of San Francisco
Landforms of the San Francisco Bay Area
Point San Quentin